Battle of New Haven may refer to:

See Tryon's raid for Battle of New Haven (American Revolutionary War), a 1779 American Revolutionary War battle in New Haven, Connecticut, during which British forces captured Black Rock Fort
See New Haven Battlefield Site for Battle of New Haven (American Civil War), an 1862 battle in the American Civil War in New Haven, Kentucky, which began as a raid by Confederate general John Hunt Morgan